Maharaja Bir Bikram College Stadium is a multi-use stadium in Agartala, India.  It is used mostly for cricket matches.  The stadium holds 30,000 people and was built in 1998.

Name and location
The college and the stadium are named after former king of Tripura Maharaja Bir Bikram Kishore Debbarman. The ground is located in the Maharaja Bir Bikram College campus. It lies opposite the college's main block, beside College Tilla Lake, surrounded by trees and parkland.

History
The stadium has been the home ground for the Tripura cricket team since 1998–99. Up to late December 2016 there had been 44 first-class matches there.

References

External links
 Maharaja Bir Bikram College Stadium at Cricinfo
 Maharaja Bir Bikram College Stadium, Agartala at CricketArchive
 Photos of Maharaja Bir Bikram College Stadium at Mapio.net

Cricket grounds in Tripura
Sports venues in Agartala
University sports venues in India
Sports venues completed in 1998
1998 establishments in Tripura
20th-century architecture in India